Jhankaradhvani or Jhankaradhwani (pronounced jhankāradhvani) is a ragam in Carnatic music (musical scale of South Indian classical music). It is the 19th Melakarta rāgam in the 72 melakarta rāgam system of Carnatic music.

It is called 'Jhankārabhramari in Muthuswami Dikshitar school of Carnatic music.

Structure and Lakshana

It is the 1st rāgam in the 4th chakra Veda. The mnemonic name is Veda-Pa. The mnemonic phrase is sa ri gi ma pa dha na. Its  structure (ascending and descending scale) is as follows (see swaras in Carnatic music for details on below notation and terms):
: 
: 
(the notes in this scale are chathusruthi rishabham, sadharana gandharam, shuddha madhyamam, shuddha dhaivatham, shuddha nishadham)

As it is a melakarta rāgam, by definition it is a sampoorna rāgam (has all seven notes in ascending and descending scale). It is the shuddha madhyamam equivalent of Shamalangi, which is the 55th melakarta.

Asampurna Melakarta 
Jhankārabhramari is the 19th Melakarta in the original list compiled by Venkatamakhin. The notes used in the scale are the same, but the zig-zag usage of notes in both ascending and descending scle (vakra prayoga) is the difference.
: 
:

Janya rāgams 
Jhankaradhvani has a few minor janya rāgams (derived scales) associated with it. See List of janya rāgams for full list of rāgams associated with Jhankaradhvani.

Compositions
A couple of compositions set to this musical scale are:

Phanipati sayee by Thyagaraja
Varnam tharum by Koteeswara Iyer
Jhasha Kethana Pitaram by Dr. M. Balamuralikrishna

Himachala kumarim bhaja by Muthuswami Dikshitar is set to Jhankārabhramari rāgam.

Related rāgams
This section covers the theoretical and scientific aspect of this rāgam.

Jhankaradhvani's notes when shifted using Graha bhedam, yields 2 other minor melakarta rāgams, namely, Ratnangi and Gamanashrama. Graha bhedam is the step taken in keeping the relative note frequencies same, while shifting the shadjam to the next note in the rāgam. For further details and an illustration refer Graha bhedam on Ratnangi.

Notes

References

Melakarta ragas